Liz Filter (born March 29, 1965) is an American sailor. She competed in the Yngling event at the 2004 Summer Olympics.

References

External links
 

1965 births
Living people
American female sailors (sport)
Olympic sailors of the United States
Sailors at the 2004 Summer Olympics – Yngling
Sportspeople from Washington, D.C.
21st-century American women